The 2009 Odisha Legislative Assembly election took place in April 2009, concurrently with the general election. The elections were held in the state in two phases. The results were declared on 16 May. Despite having recently separated from the Bharatiya Janata Party after an eleven-year partnership, the Biju Janata Dal (BJD) retained power in the Odisha State Assembly with a more convincing majority. Party chief Naveen Patnaik was formally re-elected as the BJD Legislature party leader on 19 May, thus paving the way for his third consecutive term as the Chief Minister of Odisha.

Previous Assembly
In the 2004 Orissa Assembly election, the National Democratic Alliance (NDA) had swept the state with the BJD winning 61 seats and the Bharatiya Janata Party (BJP) winning 32 seats, giving the alliance comfortable majority in the 147-member house. This was the second consecutive term for the BJD-BJP combine after they first formed the government in 2000. The Naveen Patnaik government had been sworn in at the Bhubaneswar Raj Bhavan by Odisha Governor M. M. Rajendran in May 2004.

Background
With the tenure of the Orissa Assembly scheduled to expire on 29 June 2009, the Election Commission of India announced on 2 March that year that the elections to the Assembly would be held alongside the general election. The election in each Assembly constituency (AC) was held in the same phase as the election to the corresponding Parliamentary constituency that the AC fell under.

Seat-sharing discussions got underway between allies, after eleven years of partnership and nearly two full terms as the Orissa state government, the BJD snapped ties with the BJP in March 2009, blaming the latter for the 2008 violence against Christians. Thereafter, the BJP withdrew support to Government and Governor Murlidhar Chandrakant Bhandare asked Chief Minister Naveen Patnaik to prove his majority in the Orissa Assembly. Naveen Patnaik then won a controversial trust vote on 11 May 2009, after the opposition Congress and BJP legislators walked out of the Assembly in protest in the manner the vote was being conducted.

The BJD then declared that they support neither Congress nor BJP. Though they decided to contest the 2009 elections in partnership with the Left Front and Nationalist Congress Party, the BJD did not officially join the Third Front.

Schedule of election

Results

Government formation
Despite fighting against both BJP & Congress, the BJD emerged victorious with more than two-thirds majority in the 147 member Legislative Assembly. Naveen Patnaik was sworn in for his third consecutive term by Governor M.C. Bhandare on 2009-05-21 at the Bhubaneswar Raj Bhavan.

Number of seats

Number of candidates

Elected members

See also
 State Assembly elections in India, 2009
 Indian general election in Orissa, 2009
 Legislative Assembly election results of Orissa

References

State Assembly elections in Odisha
2009 State Assembly elections in India
2000s in Orissa